Bakersfield is an unincorporated community in Pecos County, Texas, United States. According to the Handbook of Texas, the dispersed community had an estimated population of 30 in 2000.

Geography
Its most visible feature is an Exxon station on Farm to Market Road 11 serving motorists traveling on Interstate 10. The community is located almost halfway between El Paso and San Antonio, nearly 275 miles from each.

History
The community was established in 1929 after the discovery of oil in Taylor-Link field. The community was named after J.T. Baker, a promoter who had hoped to develop the townsite. A post office opened in the community that same year. Bakersfield grew rapidly and the population was estimated at just over 1,000 in 1930. The period of rapid growth was short-lived, however, as oil production and prices declined during the 1930s. Buildings were sold for the lumber or moved off site. By 1945, Bakersfield had an estimated population of 50 residents and two businesses. The number of inhabitants had further declined to around 30, a figure that remained unchanged throughout the later half of the 20th century.

Education
Public education in the community of Bakersfield is provided by the Iraan-Sheffield Independent School District.

References

External links

Unincorporated communities in Texas
Unincorporated communities in Pecos County, Texas
1929 establishments in Texas
Populated places established in 1929